Amara is a railway station in San Sebastián, Basque Country, Spain. It is owned by Euskal Trenbide Sarea and operated by Euskotren. It is the eastern terminus of the Bilbao-San Sebastián line and is also served by the suburban Topo service.

History 
The station opened in 1895 as the eastern terminus of the San Sebastián-Elgoibar railway (which at the time only reached ). In 1912, the San Sebastián-Hendaye line opened, connecting with the existing narrow-gauge railway at Amara.

Originally, the station wasn't the terminus for the San Sebastián-Hendaye railway. Instead, it reached the city center by running on the streets. Since 1942, there railway and the city council had been in disagreement over the street-running service, and the city loop closed in 1954.

The original station was located to the north of the current one. It was a provisional building built in 1900, and starting in 1912 the substitution of the station was being considered. Various projects were presented, but ultimately they weren't carried out. By the 1970s it was visibly obsolete, and plans for the relocation of the station started to gain traction.

In 1982, the city council and Basque Railways reached an agreement for the rebuilding of the station. Works on the current station building started in 1988, and by mid-1989 it was nearing completion. It was officially inaugurated on 27 June 1990.

As part of the new underground loop through the city center, the station will close and be replaced by a new underground station. The tracks will be dismantled and apartment buildings will be built in the former station area.

Services 
The station is served by Euskotren Trena lines E1, E2 and E5. Line E1 runs every 30 minutes (in each direction) during weekdays, and every hour during weekends.

Lines E2 and E5 form the suburban Topo service. Line E2 runs every 15 minutes to and from  during weekdays, and every 30 minutes during weekends. In the  direction, line E2 runs every 15 minutes during weekdays and weekend afternoons, and every 30 minutes on weekend mornings. Line E5 serves the  branch, running every 15 minutes on weekdays and weekend afternoons, and every 30 minutes on weekend mornings. This gives a combined headway between Amara and Herrera of 7.5 minutes during most of the week.

References

External links
 

Euskotren Trena stations
Railway stations in San Sebastián
Railway stations in Spain opened in 1895